Prithipal Chatterjee (born 19 October 1943) is an Indian former sports shooter. He competed in the 50 metre rifle, prone event at the 1972 Summer Olympics.

References

1943 births
Living people
Indian male sport shooters
Olympic shooters of India
Shooters at the 1972 Summer Olympics
Place of birth missing (living people)